John David Hawkins (born September 16, 1945) is an American academic in the field of social work. He is Endowed Professor in Prevention Emeritus and founding director of the Social Development Research Group in the School of Social Work at the University of Washington. His research focuses on the prevention of behavior problems in children and adolescents, and he helped to develop the Communities That Care program with Richard F. Catalano.

References

External links
Faculty page

1945 births
Living people
American social workers
Social work scholars
University of Washington faculty
Stanford University alumni
Northwestern University alumni